Caroline Ammel (born 22 November 1973 at Blanc-Mesnil) is a former French athlete, who specialized in the pole vault.

Biography  
She won three titles French National Pole Vault Championships: two Outdoor in 1995 and 2000, and one Indoors in 1996.

Caroline was the first female record holder for the pole vault (French records) vaulting 3.91 m (1994). She four times improved the national record:  4.16 m and 4.21 m in 1997, and 4.22 m and 4.23 m in 1998. Her personal best is 4.30 m (2000).

Prize list  
 French Championships in Athletics   :  
 winner of the pole vault in 1995 and 2000   
 French Indoors Athletics Championships:  
 winner of the pole vault in 1996

Records

Notes and references

External links  
 
 Olympic profile for Caroline Ammel on sports-reference.com

1973 births
Living people
French female pole vaulters
People from Le Blanc-Mesnil
Athletes (track and field) at the 2000 Summer Olympics
Olympic athletes of France
Sportspeople from Seine-Saint-Denis